Charming Hostess is a band that grew out of the avant-rock scene of Oakland, California, in the mid-1990s.

Current work
The music of Charming Hostess primarily springs from three women with an emphasis in the body—voices and vocal percussion, handclaps and heartbeats, sex-breath and silence. The work grows from diaspora consciousness: both Jewish and African. Stylistically, Charming Hostess incorporates doo-wop, Pygmy counterpoint, Balkan harmony and Andalusian melody. Contemporary influences on the band include Meredith Monk and Reinette l'Oranaise. The music often explores existing text and overlays the composer's (Jewlia Eisenberg) own questions of authenticity, montage, and the effect of music on non-verbal languages.

The Bowls Project Album (Release Summer 2010):
Based on inscriptions from ancient Babylonian Jewish amulets, The Bowls Project, as Charming Hostess. (Tzadik Records, Radical Jewish Culture, 2010) sings of mysticism and magic, angels and demons, and the trials and joys of love and sex. Especially audible are the voices of Talmudic-era women: their work, hopes and dreams. Weaving together Babylonian devotional songs, apocalyptic American folk music and a radical take on ritual power. Honored guests on 2010 The Bowls Project album include:
Marc Ribot, Jenny Scheinman, Megan Gould, Jessica Troy, Nils Frykdahl, Dawn McCarthy, Ganda Suthivarakom, Boris Martzinovsky, Aaron Kierbel, and Nir Waxman.

The Bowls Project Installation & Sound Sculpture:
As a performance installation and interactive sound sculpture that takes place in a 40’ Catalan vault designed by architect Michael Ramage. Featuring new music composed and performed by Jewlia Eisenberg and Charming Hostess, The Bowls Project is based on texts from ancient Babylonian amulets. The culmination of five years of research, The Bowls Project was exhibited at Yerba Buena Center for the Arts in 2010.

The Bowls Project Background:
Bowl amulets also known as Incantation bowls were common 1500 years ago in the area that is now Iraq. Simple bowls were inscribed with a householder's secrets and desires and then buried under the doorway to protect the home. The bowl texts are about “secrets of the home”: love and intimacy, angels and demons, and the trials and joys of daily life. Audible in these texts are the individual voices of women from this period - their work, hopes, and dreams. These spiraled inscriptions are among the few existing records of female voices during the time and place of the Babylonian Talmud.

The 2002 CD Trilectic (Tzadik Records) explored the political/erotic nexus of Walter Benjamin and his Marxist muse, Asja Lācis. The 2004 CD Sarajevo Blues (Tzadik) sets Bosnian poetry by Semezdin Mehmedinović as a form of love and resistance to the brutalization of war.

Their self-described genre is “Nerdy-Sexy-Commie-Girly”. Charming Hostess is Jewlia Eisenberg, Marika Hughes, Cynthia Taylor and often Ganda Suthivarakom and Pameliya Kursten (all vocals).

Early work
The pre-2002 Charming Hostess (also known as Charming Hostess Big Band) was a rock band that embraced a  genderfuck sensibility (the women often wore mustaches while the men wore dresses). Early Charming Hostess music drew on women's vocal traditions (primarily from Eastern Europe and North Africa) and integrated them with American folk forms both white and black. Charming Hostess was founded in the fertile anarchy of Barrington Co-op (aka Barrington Hall), and nurtured by the West Oakland arts community, along with other coeval bands such as Fibulator and Eskimo. Half of Charming Hostess was also in Idiot Flesh/Sleepytime Gorilla Museum. The final effect was of a hoedown where bodacious babes belted the blues in Bulgarian while a punk-klezmer band rocked out in accompaniment.

The genre of this incarnation of ChoHo is described by the band as “Klezmer-Punk/Balkan-Funk”. Recordings of Charming Hostess Big Band include Eat (Vaccination, 1998) and Punch (ReR, 2005). Charming Hostess Big Band was: Jewlia Eisenberg (voice, direction), Carla Kihlstedt (voice, fiddle), Nina Rolle (voice, accordion), Wes Anderson (drums), Nils Frykdahl (guitar, flute, saxophone, percussion), and Dan Rathbun (bass).

References

 Hooper, Joseph. "Monk, Eisenberg and Banhart: Oh Me, Oh My, They're So Unusual", The New York Observer, December 2, 2002.
 Cowley, Julian. "Soundcheck: Jewlia Eisenberg Trilectic", The Wire. March 2002.
 Weisberg, Rob. "Transpacific Sound Paradise",-2:19:30, WFMU, New York, NY, June 5, 2010.

External links
Charming Hostess official website 
 
 
BBC interview with Charming Hostess Founder/Composer Jewlia Eisenberg 
2010 Transpacific Sound Paradise Interview with Charming Hostess Founder/Composer Jewlia Eisenberg, WFMU, NY, NY. 

Dark cabaret musicians
Gypsy punk
Musical groups established in 1999
Tzadik Records artists
American experimental musical groups
1999 establishments in California